Lion's Den is a small town in Zimbabwe.

Location
The town lies in Makonde District, Mashonaland West Province, in central northern Zimbabwe. The coordinates of the town are: Latitude:-17.2700; Longitude:30.0250 (17° 16' 12.00"S, 30° 1' 30.00"E).

Overview
Lion's Den is a small farming town. Crops raised in the surrounding countryside include cotton, maize and tobacco. In addition, cattle is raised on a commercial basis for milk and beef.

Population
The current population of Lion's Den is not publicly known. In 2011, the population in the town was estimated at less than 1,000 people. The next national population census in Zimbabwe is scheduled from 18 August 2012 through 28 August 2012.

See also
 Districts of Zimbabwe
 Provinces of Zimbabwe
 Economy of Zimbabwe

References

Populated places in Mashonaland West Province
Makonde District